Waddells Corner (also known as Waddles Corner) is a populated place in Dorchester County, Maryland, United States.

See also
Choptank, Maryland

References

Populated places in Dorchester County, Maryland